Plectromerus louisantoini is a species of beetle in the family Cerambycidae. It was described by Dalens and Touroult in 2007.

References

Cerambycinae
Beetles described in 2007